A good luck charm or lucky charm is an item that is believed to bring luck.

Lucky charm may also refer to:

Arts, entertainment, and media 
Lucky Charm (album), 1994 album by The Black Sorrows
"Lucky Charm" (song), 1989 song by The Boys
"Lucky Charm", a song by The Apples in Stereo from Fun Trick Noisemaker
"Lucky Charm", a song by The Isley Brothers from Body Kiss
"Lucky Charm", a 1972 song by Steve Peregrin Took from the 1995 posthumous album The Missing Link To Tyrannosaurus Rex
Lucky Charm (film), 2008 Indian Hindi film directed by Aziz Mirza
Lucky Charm (novel), 2006 novel in the Beacon Street Girls series by Annie Bryant
"Lucky Charm" (Care Bears episode)

Other uses 
Lucky Charms, a cereal

See also 
Amulet, a close cousin of the talisman, consists of any object intended to bring good luck and/or protection to its owner
List of lucky symbols
Touch piece